This is a list of major bridges in Sydney, New South Wales, Australia.

Road bridges

Alfords Point 
Anzac
Bennelong (private vehicles not permitted) 
Bernie Banton
Brooklyn
Captain Cook
De Burghs
Endeavour
Fig Tree
Fullers
Gasworks Bridge
Gladesville
Glebe Island Bridge
Iron Cove
James Ruse Drive
Lansdowne
Lennox
Long Gully Bridge
Peats Ferry Bridge
 Richmond Bridge
Roseville
Ryde
Silverwater
Spit
Sydney Harbour
Tarban Creek
Tom Uglys
Victoria Bridge, Penrith
Victoria Bridge, Picton
Windsor
Woronora
 Yarramundi Bridge

Railway bridges

Clyde-Carlingford
Como
Glebe Viaduct
Hawkesbury River
Jubilee Park Viaduct
Knapsack Gully viaduct
Lewisham viaduct
John Whitton
Holsworthy rail
Menangle
Picton viaduct
Richmond bridge - Kurrajong line
Wentworth Park Viaduct

Pedestrian bridges

Albert Cotter
Arncliffe
Balgowlah
Boothtown Aqueduct
Elizabeth Street (Parramatta)
Fairfield West
Huntleys Point
Kogarah 
Linley Point
Macquarie Culvert
Mt Annan
Pyrmont
Meadowbank
Rozelle
Skye Winter (Claymore)
Sydney University footbridge (Darlington)
Sydney University footbridge (Forest Lodge)
Woollahra

Closed bridges
Glebe Island

See also

Historic bridges of New South Wales

References

Bridges
Sydney bridges
Sydney